Daryn Wayne Colledge (born February 11, 1982) is a former American football offensive guard who played in the National Football League (NFL) for nine seasons. He was selected in the second round of the 2006 NFL Draft by the Green Bay Packers and won Super Bowl XLV with them over the Pittsburgh Steelers. Colledge then played for the Arizona Cardinals and Miami Dolphins. From Alaska, he played college football at Boise State University.

High school career
Born in Fairbanks, Alaska, Colledge grew up in nearby North Pole. He graduated from North Pole High School and was a first-team all-state defensive lineman for the Patriots.

College career
Colledge played college football at Boise State, then in the Western Athletic Conference (WAC). A four-year starter for the Broncos under head coach Dan Hawkins, he was a two-time All-WAC selection in 2004 and 2005, and was second-team in 2003 as a sophomore. Colledge was one of the 38 former Boise State players that have been drafted into the NFL since 2000. In college, Colledge played as an offensive tackle for the Boise State Broncos.

Professional Football Career

Green Bay Packers
Colledge was selected by the Packers in the second round (47th overall) of the 2006 NFL Draft, the highest-ever selection from the state of Alaska. He transitioned from playing offensive tackle at Boise State to playing offensive guard for the Green Bay Packers. During his fifth and final season in Green Bay in 2010, the Packers won Super Bowl XLV, beating the Pittsburgh Steelers by a score of 31–25. Following the game, he became an unrestricted free agent.

Arizona Cardinals
On July 29, 2011, Colledge announced on his Twitter page that he and the Arizona Cardinals agreed to a five-year contract, and he played three seasons with the team.

On March 8, 2014, Arizona told Colledge he would be released into free agency on Tuesday, March 11. By waiting, the Cardinals were able to spread the cap charge of releasing Colledge over a period of two years.

Miami Dolphins
On June 30, 2014, the Miami Dolphins acquired Daryn Colledge through free agency, signing him to a one-year contract worth $2 million. He got a guaranteed $250,000 at the time of his signing.

After the 2014 season, Colledge retired from professional football.

Professional Work Career 
On March 22, 2016, Colledge announced that he enlisted in the Idaho Army National Guard.

During his time in the National Guard he flew Black Hawk UH 60 Helicopter and served on one tour in Afghanistan. 

After finishing his term with the Idaho Army National Guard, Colledge returned to his Alma Mater (Boise State) and was named as director of development and Varsity B coordinator in November of 2021.

References

External links

Green Bay Packers bio
Alaska High School Hall of Fame

1982 births
American football offensive guards
Arizona Cardinals players
Boise State Broncos football players
Green Bay Packers players
Living people
Miami Dolphins players
Sportspeople from Fairbanks, Alaska
People from North Pole, Alaska
Players of American football from Alaska